Pit Schlechter (born 26 October 1990 in Luxembourg City) is a Luxembourgish former professional cyclist, who rode professionally between 2010 and 2019 for the  and  squads.

Major results
Source: 

2007
 National Junior Road Championships
1st  Road race
3rd Time trial
2008
 2nd Time trial, National Junior Road Championships
2009
 2nd Time trial, National Under-23 Road Championships
2011
 3rd  Road race, Games of the Small States of Europe
 National Under-23 Road Championships
3rd Time trial
3rd Road race
2012
 3rd Road race, National Under-23 Road Championships
2013
 1st GP Marc Angel
 2nd Road race, National Road Championships
 5th Ronde Pévéloise
2015
 3rd Road race, National Road Championships
 5th Grand Prix de la ville de Pérenchies
 5th Gooikse Pijl

References

External links

1990 births
Living people
Luxembourgian male cyclists
Sportspeople from Luxembourg City
European Games competitors for Luxembourg
Cyclists at the 2015 European Games